The Lecomte Stakes is a Grade III American Thoroughbred horse race for three-year-old horses at a distance of one and one-sixteenths miles on the dirt run annually in mid-January, at Fair Grounds Race Course in New Orleans, Louisiana.  The event currently offers a purse of $200,000.

History

Early years - Open era (1943-61)
The event was inaugurated 20 February 1943 as the LeCompte Handicap with handicap conditions for four-year-olds and older over a distance of one and one-eighth miles. The race was won by Emerson Francis Woodward's Valdina Farms standout Valdina Orphan who started a short priced 2/5 odds-on favorite winning easily by two lengths in a time of 1:51 flat. Three months later Emerson Francis Woodward and his wife Bessie were killed in an accident with a train at a graded crossing in his home state of Texas.

The event was named after the town of Lecompte, Louisiana, which was named but incorrectly spelt after a famous 19th century race horse owned by the Wells family who lived on a plantation south of the town. The horse's name was Lecomte, who is known as the only horse to defeat Lexington.  Lecomte's dam was the brilliant Reel.

The event was programmed as a preparatory race for the Fair Grounds signature event for older horses, the New Orleans Handicap which in the era was scheduled one or two weeks after this race with the place getters receiving automatic entry.

In 1945 the event was not held due to World War II. In 1948 the eight-year-old Jack S. L. became the first two time winner of the event. In 1949 the result of the event was a dead heat between My Request and Caillou Rouge. My Request won and would go on and win the New Orleans Handicap. In 1951 Joe W. Brown's four-year-old filly won the event Thelma Berger as part of his two horse entry in event with Riverlane and to date remains the only filly or mare to have won the event. The 1953 winner Smoke Screen also won the New Orleans Handicap.

In 1955 the event was run as the LeComte Handicap with reference to the correct name of the famous horse.

In 1961 one of Fair Grounds' favorite horses Mrs. Joe W. Brown's Tenacious won the event for the third straight time. In 1958 Tenacious finished third as the 11/10 favorite to the two time winner Speed Rouser, but would go on and win the New Orleans Handicap. In 1959 Tenacious set a new track record of 1:43 flat for the  miles distance. The 1961 running of the event would be the last time the race was scheduled as an event for older horses.

Three-year-old event (1962 onwards)

In 1962 the conditions of the event were changed that only three-year-olds could enter. The event immediately became a preparatory race for the Louisiana Derby which was held later in the meeting in March. The 1963 winner City Line won the event defeating Lemon Twist by five lengths and setting a new stakes record of 1:42. City Line would go on and repeat his win in his next start defeating Lemon Twist again by eight lengths in the Louisiana Derby. Mrs. Dorothy Dorsett Brown's two horse entry of Dapper Delegate and Doc Wesley won the event in 1965 starting at the short odds of 1/2. Dapper Delegate would also go on and in a fortnight capture the Louisiana Derby.

The first winner of the LeComte Handicap to make an impact on the American Triple Crown events was Joseph R. Straus's 1972 winner No Le Hace. No Le Hace started as the 6/5 favorite and won by  lengths winning his third straight race. No Le Hace would win the Louisiana Derby and the go to Oaklawn Park and win the Arkansas Derby. No Le Hace proceeded in running second at Churchill Downs in the Derby Trial Stakes a week before the Kentucky Derby. In the 1972 Kentucky Derby No Le Hace finished second to Riva Ridge and two weeks later finished second in the 1972 Preakness Stakes at Pimlico to Bee Bee Bee.

A major upset occurred in the 1988 running of the event when Thomas Leavell's Pastourelles defeated the heavily backed 3/10 odds-favorite Risen Star by a length and a quarter. Risen Star would turn the tables on Pastourelles in the Louisiana Derby Trial Stakes and Louisiana Derby. More impressive was Risen Star's campaign in the American Triple Crown events where he won 1988 Preakness Stakes and then the Belmont Stakes by  lengths.

In 1991 the distance of the event was decreased to one mile.

In 2003 the American Graded Stakes Committee classified the event as Grade III.

Due to the catastrophic damage caused by of Hurricane Katrina in 2005 the winter meeting was abbreviated and held at Louisiana Downs and  the event was not scheduled.

The event was held over a distance of a mile and 40 yards in 2010 and 2011 and was increased to a mile and 70 yards in 2012.

In 2013 Oxbow won the event by a stakes record  lengths. Later in May Oxbow won the 2013 Preakness Stakes at Pimlico. The 2019 winner War of Will also went onto win the 2019 Preakness Stakes.

In 2020 the event's distance was set to the  miles distance, last run in 1991.

The event is part of the Road to the Kentucky Derby.

Records
Speed  record:
 miles: 1:42.40 – City Line (1963)
1 mile & 70 yards:  1:42.57 – Vicar's in Trouble  (2014)
1 mile & 40 yards:  1:39.29 – Fly Cry  (1994)
1 mile: 1:37.60 – Dixieland Heat (1993)
 
Margins:
 lengths – Oxbow (2013)

Most wins by a jockey:
 5 – Robby Albarado (1998, 2001, 2005, 2012, 2017)

Most wins by a trainer:
 5 – John B. Theall  (1946, 1951, 1959, 1960, 1961)

Most wins by an owner:
 3 - Mr. & Mrs. Joe W. Brown (1951, 1959, 1960, 1961, 1965, 1967)

Lecomte Stakes – Louisiana Derby double:
City Line (1963), Dapper Delegate (1965), No Le Hace (1972), Clev Er Tell (1977), Dixieland Heat (1993), Friesan Fire (2009), International Star (2015)

Winners

Notes:

§ Ran as an entry

ƒ Filly or Mare

See also
Road to the Kentucky Derby
List of American and Canadian Graded races

References

Fair Grounds Race Course
Triple Crown Prep Races
Graded stakes races in the United States
Horse races in New Orleans
Horse racing
Flat horse races for three-year-olds
Recurring sporting events established in 1943
1943 establishments in Louisiana
Grade 3 stakes races in the United States